Svali Hrannar Björgvinsson (born 24 May 1967) is an Icelandic business man, sportscaster and former basketball player.

Basketball career

Club career
Svali played his first senior game with Valur  in the Úrvalsdeild karla during the 1984–1985 season. He spent the following season with Nelson High School in the United States before returning to Valur in 1986. He played 99 games for Valur in the Úrvalsdeild before retiring.

National team career
Svali played two games for the Icelandic men's national basketball team in 1990.

Coaching career
Svali coached Valur men's team for several seasons in Úrvalsdeild karla while also coaching Valur women's team and KR women's team for one season each in Úrvalsdeild kvenna.

He was the head coach of the Icelandic women's national basketball team during the 1995 Games of the Small States of Europe in Luxembourg.

Broadcasting career
Svali works as a play-by-play broadcaster of Úrvalsdeild karla games at Stöð 2 Sport and is well known for his lively phrases.

Outside of basketball
Svali worked at Kaupþing from 2003 until 2009 when he joined Icelandair. In 2018, he joined Sjóvá.

References

External links
 Úrvalsdeild statistics at kki.is

1967 births
Living people
Svali Bjorgvinsson
Svali Bjorgvinsson
Svali Bjorgvinsson
Svali Bjorgvinsson
Svali Bjorgvinsson
Svali Bjorgvinsson
Svali Bjorgvinsson
Svali Bjorgvinsson
Guards (basketball)